Sir Walter Alexander Raleigh (5 September 1861 – 13 May 1922) was an English scholar, poet, and author. Raleigh was also a Cambridge Apostle.

Biography
Walter Alexander Raleigh was born in London, the fifth child and only son of a local Congregationalist minister. Raleigh was educated at the City of London School, Edinburgh Academy, University College London, and King's College, Cambridge.

He was Professor of English Literature at the Mohammedan Anglo-Oriental College in Aligarh in India (1885–87), Professor of Modern Literature at the University College Liverpool (1890–1900), Regius Professor of English Language and Literature at Glasgow University (1900–1904), and in 1904 became the first holder of the Chair of English Literature at Oxford University and he was a fellow of Merton College, Oxford (1914–22). Raleigh was knighted in 1911. Among his works are Style (1897), Milton (1900) and Shakespeare (1907), but in his day he was more renowned as a stimulating if informal lecturer than as a critic.

On the outbreak of World War I, he turned to the war as his primary subject. Raleigh's correspondence during the war revealed strong anti-German beliefs: one letter stated "German University Culture is mere evil", and added that the deaths "of 100 Boche professors ... would be a benefit to the human race".  His finest book may be the first volume of The War in the Air (1922), whose volumes II to VI (1928–1937, plus 3 volumes of maps) had to be compiled by Henry Albert Jones after Raleigh's death.

In 1915, he delivered the Vanuxem lectures at Princeton on "The Origins of Romance" and "The Beginnings of the Romantic Revival," and lectured on Chaucer at Brown, which gave him the degree of Litt.D.

Raleigh died at the Acland Nursing Home, Oxford, from typhoid (contracted during a visit to the Near East) on 13 May 1922 (aged 60), being survived by his wife, Lucie Gertrude Jackson (sister-in-law of Catherine Carswell), three of their four sons, and a daughter. His daughter Philippa married the writer Charles Whibley. He is buried in the churchyard of the parish church of St. Lawrence at North Hinksey, near Oxford.

His son Hilary edited his light prose, verse and plays in Laughter from a Cloud (1923). Raleigh is probably best known for the poem "Wishes of an Elderly Man, Wished at a Garden Party, June 1914":

Raleigh Park at North Hinksey, near Harcourt Hill where he lived from 1909 to his death, is named after him. The Department of English at Aligarh Muslim University has an active Raleigh Literary Society, which regularly organises performances of scenes from Shakespeare's plays.

Bibliography
 Anthumous
 The English Novel (1894)
 Robert Louis Stevenson:  An Essay (1895); 2nd edition, 1896
 Style (1897)
 Milton (1900); 1905 reprint
 Wordsworth (1903)
 The English Voyagers (1904)
 Shakespeare (1907)
 
 Six Essays on Johnson (1910)
 Early English Voyages of the 16th Century (1910)
 Shakespeare's England : an account of the life & manners of his age (1916, with Sir Sidney Lee)
  Annual Shakespeare Lecture of the British Academy (1918)
 The War in the Air: being the story of the part played in the Great War by the Royal Air Force, Volume I: "Air operations of the 1915 Gallipoli campaign; the Western Front in 1915/1916; naval air operations." (1922; revised 1939)

 Posthumous
 The Letters of Sir Walter Raleigh 1879–1922 (1926, 2 volumes; 1928, enlarged); reprinted as The Letters of Sir Walter Raleigh 1879 to 1922 (2005, 2-in-1 volume)

References
Glasgow James MacLehose and Sons Publishers to the University

External links

 
 
 

1861 births
1922 deaths
People from North Hinksey
Alumni of King's College, Cambridge
Alumni of University College London
People educated at the City of London School
Fellows of Merton College, Oxford
Academic staff of Aligarh Muslim University
Merton Professors of English Literature
Deaths from typhoid fever
19th-century English writers
20th-century English writers
Writers from London
English male poets
19th-century English male writers
Knights Bachelor